Zero-carbon housing is a term used to describe a house that does not emit greenhouse gasses, specifically carbon dioxide (CO2), into the atmosphere. Homes release greenhouse gases through burning fossil fuels in order to provide heat, or even while cooking on a gas stove. A zero carbon house can be achieved by either building or renovating a home to be very energy efficient and for its energy consumption to be from non-emitting sources, for example electricity.

According to a 2020 UN report, building and construction practices are responsible for ~38% of all energy-related carbon emissions. For this reason, the building industry is pushing to find alternative means and methods to reduce the amount of emissions that are associated with both the construction process and the day to day operations to maintain buildings.

Definitions 
Zero carbon housing:

 A home that is designed and implemented in such a way that it does not release any additional carbon emissions into the atmosphere by sustaining itself with clean energy. This means that the energy the house consumes is purely electric.

Zero energy housing:

 A home that is designed and built to produce enough of its own renewable energy to sustain itself without needing to rely on the grid. This is different from zero carbon housing because its goal is to produce 100% of its own clean energy.

Passive house:

 A home that focuses of high insulation with an airtight building envelope. High levels of insulation mean the house is able to use less energy for heating and cooling depending on the climate it is in.

Active house:

 A home that focuses on the health and comfort of the occupants. This focus is present in the increased natural lighting and ventilation the house is designed for.

Goals of Zero Carbon Housing 
There are a two main goals to strive for in creating zero carbon homes:

 The first goal is to create a passive house which is remarkably well insulated and nearly completely airtight.
 In constructing a new home, this means windows are placed strategically such that they absorb the heat from sunlight in the winter yet also minimize its heat in the summer.
 For renovation of existing homes, this requires the building envelop to be upgraded. Caulking areas around the house which are stationary, and weatherstripping areas that move will achieve the airtightness necessary to reduce drafts.
 The second goal is to have no natural gas lines leading into the home and that it gets its energy entirely from electricity or other renewable resources. Electricity generation is continuing to become cleaner as we are finding more ways to utilize renewable resources and transition away from coal and fossil fuels.

After implementing the methodology of a passive house in addition to being completely shut off to natural gas lines, the house can continue to be improved with various design considerations.

Design Considerations for Zero Carbon Housing 
Creating an effective zero carbon house involves multiple levels of consideration stemming from the people who chose to build and/or remodel their home, to the design team in charge of developing the proper design strategies, to the contractors who construct and implement them. It is ultimately a team effort from each contributor to work together to provide the best, most efficient zero carbon house. A few design considerations that can be implemented are outlined below. It is important to note that this is not an exhaustive list but just a few of the most common in practice. These considerations include the orientation of the building itself, incorporating elements such as smart windows, heat pumps, solar panels, and finally but most importantly installing energy efficient appliances.

Orientation of House 
As mentioned above, one main goal of a zero carbon house is to create a passive house. When building a new home, it is very important for the design team to account for orientation of the house in relation to the sun. Sunlight will directly and indirectly affect the heating and cooling of a house based on its orientation, and placement of windows. In the northern hemisphere, the south facing walls come in contact with the sun the most and for the majority of the day time. This wall becomes the most important wall to design to take advantage of when considering a passive solar design. Sunlight will hit the south facing wall and transfer its thermal energy into heat with either direct gain or indirect gain. Direct gain wall design means that the sunlight enters the house through windows placed along the southern walls and hits the floors and/or other walls. Since windows are made primarily of glass, they have a low thermal conductivity. When the sunlight passes through with its high thermal energy it cannot easily escape due to the glass’s low conductivity and its thermal energy is transferred into heat. This phenomenon is known as the greenhouse effect. As a result, the house is heated from direct sunlight penetrating through the windows.

Indirect gain wall design uses a Trombe Wall along the southern wall to store thermal energy which can slowly heat up the house. A Trombe Wall consists of a masonry wall along the southern wall perimeter with a single of double layer of glass along its exterior and about a one inch gap in between the two. The masonry wall needs to be dark colored to better absorb the sun’s thermal energy and the exterior glass layer creates a greenhouse effect to trap the heat continuously heating up the masonry wall. Over time, the heat in the wall is transferred into the house and will continue warming up the house into the night after the sun has gone down. This design works well in the northern hemisphere far from the equator because the sun’s position in the sky relative to the house changes. In the winter, the sun is much lower in the sky so it will shine against a larger area of the wall which traps more thermal energy and results in more heat gain inside with less need to use electricity to heat the home. In the summer, the sun is higher in the sky so it can be easier to block the sunlight from hitting the southern wall which doesn’t transfer as much thermal energy meaning it will not heat up as much.

Both direct and indirect gain take advantage of the sun’s thermal energy to heat up the house in the cold wintery months and through passive solar design ensure that the house does not absorb too much of it during the hot summer months.

Smart Windows 
Windows are a huge element in a home. They are great for the occupant to feel connected to the outside environment and allow lots of additional light inside. This is beneficial because the additional lighting provided from the sun means the homes lights do not need to be on as much and can save the homeowner in electricity bills. However, the more sunlight also can cause more heating of the house. Therefore, with additional light comes with additional heat. In the cold winter months, this can actually help the home by providing additional heat so the homeowner can save on heating costs, but in the hot summer months, this can add unwanted additional heat and have an unintended consequence of needing to use more energy to cool the home down.

The use of smart windows in homes can greatly impact the temperature inside by taking advantage of sunlight so that ultimately less energy is used to both heat and cool the building. Approximately 35% of a typical building’s energy is lost through its windows. There are two types of smart windows that are primarily used to control the temperature on the inside of homes: electrochromic and thermochromic. Electrochromic glass has been widely used in smart windows. An electrochromic window is able to alter the ability of light and heat to pass through the glass through the use of electrical current. These windows consist of five layers: two glass layers on the exterior, two layers that serve as electrodes which act as the positive and negative poles in a battery, and a middle electrolyte layer containing ions. When voltage is applied to the window, positively charged ions develop on one side of the window while negatively charged ones move to the other side. This reaction creates a tint to the window which will stay until voltage is again applied to cause a reverse reaction. Electrochromic windows allow the homeowner to decide when they want to allow more sunlight in or block it which gives them more of a sense of control over the amount of energy they use for heating and cooling. On the other hand, thermochromic windows are windows that change in response to heat. These windows have fewer layers than electrochromic windows, typically two layers of glass, with an inner layer of a thermochromic laminate. The thermochromic laminate can be made of various different materials which are temperature responsive and can cause the glass to tint when it reaches high enough temperatures to block heat out, or become more transparent when cool enough to let more light and heat in. Each material has its own threshold temperature where this transition can occur. Therefore, the best type of smart window depends up on the climate.

Heat Pumps 

A heat pump can be used in a home as an alternate heating and cooling system in comparison to furnaces and air conditioners. They run on electricity and use the same thermodynamic principles as refrigerators to transfer heat from a cool space to a warm space. The three types of heat pumps that can be used to heat or cool homes are air-to-air, water source, and geothermal. Each type collects heat from either the air, water, or the ground respectively from outside the house and the heat pump concentrates it for use inside. Heat pumps are such an energy efficient alternative because they do not generate heat like a furnace. Instead, they transfer heat from one source to the other. The heat pump absorbs energy from the outside air and transfer it inside, heating the home up. Additionally, when turned to cooling mode, they act as air conditioners and absorb heat from inside, transferring it outside to cool the home down.

Air source heat pumps are most commonly used in residential housing. They are so energy efficient that they can reduce electricity bills by about 50%. Air sourced heat pumps have advanced so much in recent years that they are even suitable for extreme cold weather conditions to provide heat inside the home.

Solar Panels 

Solar panels are one of the best ways a home can generate its own electricity. The two main technologies used to harness the suns energy and transfer it into electricity are photovoltaics (PV) and concentrating solar power (CSP). PV are the panels that can be seen on rooftops of residential homes and buildings or even out in fields. They capture the photons from the sunlight and the panels absorb them to create an electric field across its many layers which in turn creates electricity. CSP is used in very large power plants and therefore is not suitable for residential use.

At times, solar panel systems are able to produce more energy than the house needs and when this happens, some systems feed into batteries which can store the surplus of electricity. Other systems can wire directly into the home’s grid and allows the homeowner to back feed its excess electricity to the utility company. When this happens, the utility company will often pay the homeowner for the amount of electricity they give back.

Energy Efficient Appliances 
Energy efficient appliances are appliances that are designed and implemented to use less energy compared to their normal everyday household appliance yet provide the same service. Installing energy efficient appliances is one of the easiest ways to reduce energy consumption because after installation, they don’t require the occupant to consciously think about the amount of energy they will expend by turning them on; the appliance simply uses less energy due to the way it was designed.

The United States government has set a certain standard of energy efficiency and created the program Energy Star which provides certifications to consumer products that meet these standards. Energy Star provides a certified label on products they deem energy efficient and also compiles a list of these appliances, making it easy for the consumer to purchase. Energy Star certified residential homes are at the least 10% and on average 20% more energy efficient compared to homes built to standard code.

Urbanization 
Urbanized and more densely populated communities produce fewer carbon emissions per capita in comparison to suburban or rural communities. While part of this is because in urban settings, people typically are driving less due to the proximity of goods and services, another important factor is that densely populated housing means better insulation because of shared walls and floors and ceilings. With less walls exposed to the outside extreme weathers and more walls being shared, the inside environment is able to remain and maintain more steady temperatures without needing as much cooling or heating.

Benefits of Zero Carbon Housing 
Three important benefits of switching to a zero carbon house involve health, economic, and environmental benefits.

Health 
Zero carbon houses offer much cleaner indoor air because they curb fossil fuel combustion which releases volatile gases and pollutants. Appliances such as gas stove, heaters, dryers, and ovens that rely on burning fuel inside the home worsen the air quality indoors and can lead to respiratory issues for the occupants. Not only is the indoor air quality affected, but so is outdoor air quality. Pollution from residential buildings is noted to be responsible for about 15,500 deaths per year in the United States alone. Replacing appliances that run on fossil fuels can improve indoor air quality and reduce asthma symptoms in children by up to 42%, as well as decrease fire hazards in homes.

Money 
As previously mentioned, energy efficient homes can save the occupant on their utility bills by both replacing their appliances with energy efficient appliances as well as updating their insulation and building envelop. For every $1 invested in improvements towards creating a zero carbon home, approximately $2 are saved in electricity generation and utility costs.

Climate Change 
The most important benefit of zero carbon housing is the reduction in greenhouse gas emissions that are contributing to climate change. Since residential buildings and houses are a major source of greenhouse gas emissions, cities cannot achieve their climate targets without optimizing their energy efficiency. By reducing the amount of energy houses use and by cleaning up the energy they do use, zero carbon housing can significantly reduce these emissions into the atmosphere to meet the carbon neutral standards many nations are setting.

Challenges associated with Zero Carbon Housing 
While all the above examples of how to build and/or renovate a zero carbon house sound great, there are some challenges that come with switching to carbon free. A top concern for most people is the economic factor. On average, zero carbon houses can cost 5% to 15% more than a similar sized regular home. When seeing this initial increase in price, homeowners often feel discouraged and that the home will not be a good investment. However, looking at the first cost of the home alone without factoring in how much savings the energy efficient home will have is a crucial mistake. When applying the correct design strategies to create a passive, energy efficient home that can generate a significant portion of its own electricity while also being completely carbon neutral, zero carbon homes can end up saving the home homeowner money in the long run.

However, once a homeowner has invested in a zero carbon house which is completely run on electricity, both self-producing and grid dependent, there arises the issue of electrical grid power outages. While there are measures the design team has taken to help the house generate its own electricity, that does not always mean it can generate enough electricity to sustain normal household activities whereas gas powered stoves would otherwise be able to function. In this instance, it is arguable that the zero carbon house would be preferable to a normal house because while normal household activities are minimized in a power outage, there is still the backup of electricity generated from renewable sources the house has provided as well as the passive design which means the house is well insulated and has measures such direct and indirect gain to help heat it. There additionally are instances where a house is located in an area where solar power is not the most efficient means of electricity generation due to the lack of sunlight available. In this case, the design team will assess whether solar is a good option or if other renewable sources of energy are more suitable.

Finally, a big challenge in the building construction industry is embodied carbon. While the term zero carbon housing insinuates that the house is carbon free, it does not account for the fact that there are carbon emissions associated with the construction of the home, nor the carbon emitted from the materials needed to build it, nor from their transportation from source to site. In fact it is estimated that embodied carbon from new construction will be responsible for nearly half of carbon emissions between now and 2050. This is a huge consequence that new construction presents which will need to be addressed.

Success with Zero Carbon Housing 
There are several examples around the world of individual houses and even communities which have been built to be zero carbon houses and demonstrate that it is possible to live in an energy efficient home that reduces its energy consumption and its greenhouse gas emissions while also providing the occupants with the same functional lifestyle they require. One such community in particular, The Lochiel Park Green Village in South Australia, has proven that with the help of government policy and an ingenious design team, zero carbon housing is possible and practical. The design considerations that the design team implemented increase energy efficiency include solar water heating, a photovoltaic system for each house, high energy star rated appliances, and low energy lighting. In order to collect data to demonstrate that Lochiel Park was more energy efficient than a similar community of size and climate, appliance and equipment audits were performed, as well as continued energy use and generation monitoring.

As a result of the conducted study, it was concluded that compared to the average of South Australian residential homes, Lochiel Park households used significantly less energy per year per unit floor area. In fact, Lochiel Park homes are so energy efficient that when comparing them to the average of South Australia, the average total annual energy per household consumed less than half the amount of energy. Not only that but when considering the amount of energy that was delivered to Lochiel Park homes, meaning the total energy consumed minus the amount of energy the homes generated themselves independent of the grid, Lochiel Park was delivered less than a third the amount of energy as the South Australia average. This is a significant amount in energy reduction which can be attributed to the innovative design team which incorporated a combination of energy efficient technologies and self-sustaining renewable energy electricity generation.

See also 
 Green building
 Net energy gain
 Zero heating building
 Zero-energy building

References 

Sustainable architecture